The Francis Ermatinger House is located in Oregon City, Oregon, United States. Built by Francis Ermatinger in 1843, it is the oldest house in Clackamas County. It was placed on the National Register of Historic Places in 1977, and has been operated as a museum.

Built in the Greek Revival style, the house was originally located near the Willamette River, in the downtown area near Willamette Falls. Francis Ermatinger, an employee of the Hudson's Bay Company, remained in Oregon City after the company abandoned its operations there in 1845.

The house has been moved twice in its history, first in 1910 to the corner of 11th and Center streets, and again in 1986 to its current location at the corner of 6th and John Adams streets, adjacent to the Stevens Crawford House museum.

It possibly was in the Ermatinger House's left parlor that the famous coin toss between Francis Pettygrove and Asa Lovejoy occurred, reputedly during a dinner party held in the house in 1845. The two were arguing about whether the town they envisioned on their land claim, then called The Clearing, should be incorporated as Boston—Lovejoy's hometown in Massachusetts—or Portland—Pettygrove's hometown in Maine.  Pettygrove won two out of three tosses, resulting in the city of Portland, Oregon. 

Multiple versions of the coin-toss location have come down. It is agreed that the event happened in an Oregon City home in 1845. But in whose home, as it never had been explicitly stated at the time? Various stories relay that the coin toss occurred in either one of the other of their houses, or in the home of A.E. Wilson, or perhaps the home of Francis Ermatinger, the very hospitable HBC Chief Trader, whose house had a fine dining room, as well as a parlor, and a new kitchen. In any event, the Ermatinger House is the only remaining house of that early period, and hence is now suited as a site to celebrate the naming of Portland in 1845.

Before repairs were complete, damage from being moved twice had left the house unstable, resulting in the windows being removed. In 2011, it was closed to the public. The house was re-opened on July 7, 2018 by the City of Oregon City Parks and Recreation Department. Guided tours are available Fridays and Saturdays.

See also
 List of the oldest buildings in Oregon
 List of Oregon's Most Endangered Places
 National Register of Historic Places listings in Clackamas County, Oregon

References

External links

Ermatinger House from City of Oregon City Parks and Recreation Department
619 6th Street - Francis Ermatinger House from City of Oregon City Planning Department

1845 establishments in Oregon Country
Buildings and structures in Oregon City, Oregon
Greek Revival houses in Oregon
Historic house museums in Oregon
Houses in Clackamas County, Oregon
Museums in Clackamas County, Oregon
National Register of Historic Places in Clackamas County, Oregon
Oregon's Most Endangered Places